is a former Japanese football player.

Club career
Tahara was born in Aira on April 27, 1982. After graduating from high school, he joined Yokohama F. Marinos in 2001. However he could hardly play in the match and he moved to Kyoto Purple Sanga (later Kyoto Sanga FC) in September 2002. His opportunity to play decreased and he played many matches from 2004. He moved to Shonan Bellmare in 2009 and Yokohama FC in 2012. In 2014, he moved to Thailand and joined Samut Songkhram. In 2015, he returned to Japan and his local club Kagoshima United FC. He retired end of 2015 season.

National team career
In June 2001, Tahara was selected Japan U-20 national team for 2001 World Youth Championship. At this tournament, he played all 3 matches and scored a goal against Czech Republic.

Club statistics

References

External links

1982 births
Living people
Association football people from Kagoshima Prefecture
Japanese footballers
Japan youth international footballers
J1 League players
J2 League players
Japan Football League players
Yokohama F. Marinos players
Kyoto Sanga FC players
Shonan Bellmare players
Yokohama FC players
Kagoshima United FC players
Expatriate footballers in Thailand
Association football forwards